Békés was an administrative county (comitatus) of the Kingdom of Hungary. Its territory, which was smaller than that of present Békés county, is now in southeastern Hungary. The capital of the county was Gyula.

Geography

Békés county shared borders with the Hungarian counties Csongrád, Jász-Nagykun-Szolnok, Hajdú, Bihar, Arad and Csanád. The river Körös flowed through the county. Its area was 3,670 km² around 1910.

History
Békés county arose as one of the first comitatus of the Kingdom of Hungary, in the 11th century. In 1950, the territory of Békés county was expanded with: 
 the northeastern part of former Csanád-Arad-Torontál county (the Hungarian part of pre-1920 Arad county and the north-eastern part of pre-1920 Csanád county)
 a part of former Bihar county (the area around Sarkad and Okány)
 a part of Jász-Nagykun-Szolnok county (the area around Dévaványa)

Demographics

Subdivisions

In the early 20th century, the subdivisions of Békés county were:

Notes

References

States and territories established in 1699
States and territories established in 1790
States and territories established in 1860
1566 disestablishments
1786 disestablishments
States and territories disestablished in 1853
States and territories disestablished in 1946
Counties in the Kingdom of Hungary